John N.T. "Jack" Shanahan is a retired United States Air Force lieutenant general who last served as the first Director of the Joint Artificial Intelligence Center. Prior to that, he was the Director of Defense Intelligence for Warfighter Support of the Office of the Undersecretary of Defense for Intelligence. Shanahan graduated from the University of Michigan in 1984 with a B.S. degree in chemistry. He later earned an M.A. degree in national security and strategic studies from the College of Naval Command and Staff at the Naval War College in 1996 and an M.S. degree in national security strategy from the National War College in 2001.

References

External links 
 

Year of birth missing (living people)
Living people
Place of birth missing (living people)
University of Michigan College of Literature, Science, and the Arts alumni
College of Naval Command and Staff alumni
National War College alumni
Recipients of the Legion of Merit
United States Air Force generals
Recipients of the Defense Superior Service Medal
Recipients of the Air Force Distinguished Service Medal
Recipients of the Defense Distinguished Service Medal